Tmesisternus andreas is a species of beetle in the family Cerambycidae. It was described by Kriesche in 1926.

References

andreas
Beetles described in 1926